Patrick Bernasconi (born 16 July 1955 in Domjean) is a French business executive. He is responsible for four public works companies. He was elected president of the French Economic, Social and Environmental Council on 1 December 2015.

A graduate of the École Spéciale des Travaux Publics, he was the president of the National Federation of Public Works (FNTP) from 2005 to 2013 and executive board member of the MEDEF.

Biography 
As his surname suggests, Bernasconi is the grandson of an Italian bricklayer immigrant from Trentino (Molina di Ledro) who emigrated to Normandy in 1920.

References

French businesspeople
Chevaliers of the Légion d'honneur
Officers of the Ordre national du Mérite
People from Manche
People of Trentinian descent
French people of Italian descent
1955 births
Living people